Grüner Salon was a weekly talk show on the German news channel n-tv mostly hosted by Erich Böhme and Heinz Eggert.

n-tv stopped the show at the end of 2003 due to financial reasons, but also program optimization would have played a role in this decision.

Location

The program was broadcast from the Grüner Salon of the Volksbühne in Berlin.

Hosts
Heinz Eggert (1997-2002)
Erich Böhme (1997–2002)
Claus Strunz (2002-2003)
Andrea Fischer (2002-2003)

References

External links

1997 German television series debuts
2003 German television series endings
1997 establishments in Germany
2003 disestablishments in Germany
German-language television shows
N-tv original programming